Geringswalde is a town in the district of Mittelsachsen, in Saxony, Germany. It is situated 12 km northwest of Mittweida, and 27 km north of Chemnitz.

History 

The town was first mentioned in 1233 in a document confirming the establishment of a Benedictine nun's convent as Gerungeswalde as a deserted oppidum together with a destroyed castle . After the Protestant reformation, the convent was dissolved and transformed into a manor. The town was never walled. An orthodox Lutheran school was funded in 1566, but closed again in 1568 due to the founder and the rector being accused of Gnesio-Lutheranism. 134 freeholders were counted in 1587, but in 1764 there were only 36 freeholders and 168 smallholders.

A stream traversing the grounds of the town was dammed in the Middle Ages, forming a large pond known as Großteich.

Until the 19th century, the economy was chiefly based on agriculture and linen manufacture. After industrialization Geringswalde was known for the production of furniture (mainly chairs and armchairs) and cutting tools. The manor was dissolved after World War II and most of its buildings demolished. Geringswalde was part of Kreis Rochlitz from 1945 to 1994, of Landkreis Mittweida from 1994 to 2008 and belongs now to the Central Saxony administrative district.

In 1949, the neighbouring villages of Hilmsdorf and Klostergeringswalde were incorporated into the town, Altgeringswalde joined in 1994, and in 1999 Aitzendorf (with Dittmannsdorf), Arras, and Holzhausen (with Hoyersdorf and Neuwallwitz) were incorporated.

From 1893 to 1997, the town was served by the standard-gauge railway line Waldheim - Rochlitz.

Economy 

Traditional occupations were agriculture, weaving of linen, legwear knitting, tannery, and brewing. A stream drove several watermills. Industrialisation in the 19th century brought large-scale furniture making and metalworking to the town. There were also a brickyard and a cigar factory. The brewery closed in the 1920s.

After World War II until the early 1990s the economy of the town was dominated by tool making, furniture making and the production of hydraulic cylinders. Some smaller factories produced clothes, cosmetics, electronic circuits, animal fodder, and concrete parts. Most factories closed in the early 1990s, but the tradition of metalworking in particular is still continued by several small and medium-sized enterprises. A number of wind turbines has been erected on the heights surrounding the town since the 2000s.

Sights 

The neogothic Martin Luther church of 1890 replaces a former romanesque church. The neo-baroque town hall was opened in 1905, the school house in neo-renaissance style in 1894. An observation tower named after Frederick Augustus III of Saxony, situated north of the town, opened in 1907.

A copy of the 1727 Saxon post milestone (Postmeilensäule) stands near the town centre. The original is kept in a museum in Rochlitz.

A castle in the nearby forest was destroyed in the Middle Ages, only minuscule remains of its basement walls are left.

The village church of Altgeringswalde houses a painted wooden altar which was made around 1510 and restored in 1994.

Personalities 

 Wilfried Stallknecht (born 1928), architect, urban planner and furniture designer
 Roselore Sonntag (born 1934), gymnast, Olympic contender in Rome 1960 
 Wolfgang Blochwitz (1941-2005), football goalkeeper, played 19 times for the national team of the GDR

References

External links 
 Stadt Geringswalde
 Geringswalder Postmeilensäule

Mittelsachsen